Daunglan is a circular pedestal tray used to serve meals in Myanmar (Burma), especially in Upper Myanmar. Commonly made of lacquered bamboo, teak or beechwood, the daunglan is served with small bowls consisting of various dishes and soups. It is comparable to the khan tok used in Northern Thailand and Laos.

See also 
 Khan tok
 Phan (tray)

References 

Burmese cuisine
Kitchenware
Burmese culture